Langsuan Panyuthaphum is a Thai former Muay Thai fighter. Elected fighter of the year in 1987 he was also a 3 weight Lumpinee Stadium Champion during the golden era of Muay Thai.

Biography & career
Pinthong Wongpanya started Muay Thai training at the age of 14, fighting under the name of Sayannoi before joining Sasiprapa gym in 1984 and changing his ring name to Langsuan. 
Langsuan fought in Bangkok for 10 years, he was known as The Merciless Knee Striker for his relentless knee attacks from the clinch.

In 1987 Langsuan had 10 fights, he won 9 times, this performance was enough to earn him the most prestigious prize in Muay Thai, the Sports Writers Association of Thailand Fighter of the Year award.
That same year he won his first Lumpinee Stadium title at 108 lbs. Langsuan also won Lumpinee titles at 112 and 115 lbs in later years as well as a World title which he captured during a show in the United States. Langsuan was a notable fighter of his time and had purses going as high as 250,000 baht.
During his career Langsuan beat stars of his era such as Hippy Singmanee, Samson Isaan, Jaroensap Kiatbanchong, Karuhat Sor.Supawan, Veeraphol Sahaprom or Wangchannoi Sor Palangchai.

After his retirement Langsuan became a trainer in Japan. He came back to Thailand and teaches at the Suwannakhiri camp in the Phayao Province.

Titles & honours
International Muay Thai Federation
1989 I.M.F World 115 lbs Champion
Lumpinee Stadium
 1987 Lumpinee Stadium 108 lbs Champion
 1989 Lumpinee Stadium 115 lbs Champion (one defense)
 1991 Lumpinee Stadium 112 lbs Champion
 1992 Lumpinee Stadium 115 lbs Champion

Awards
 1987 Sports Writers Association of Thailand Fighter of the Year

Fight record

|-  style="background:#cfc;"
| 1994-01-20 ||Win||align=left| Thailand Pinsinchai || Rajadamnern Stadium || Bangkok, Thailand || Decision || 5 || 3:00
|-  style="background:#cfc;"
| 1993-11-18 ||Win||align=left| Kasemlek Kiatsiri || Rajadamnern Stadium || Bangkok, Thailand || Decision || 5 || 3:00
|- style="background:#fbb;"
| 1993-09-16 || Loss||align=left| Veeraphol Sahaprom || Lumpinee Stadium  ||  Bangkok, Thailand  || KO (Left Hook)|| 3 ||
|-  style="background:#cfc;"
| 1993-07-12 ||Win||align=left| Tukattatong Por.Pongsawang || Rajadamnern Stadium || Bangkok, Thailand || Decision || 5 || 3:00
|- style="background:#fbb;"
| 1993-05-17 || Loss||align=left| Duangsompong Por.Pongsawang || Rajadamnern Stadium  ||  Bangkok, Thailand  || KO || 2 ||
|- style="background:#fbb;"
| 1993-03-08 || Loss||align=left| Saenkeng Pinsinchai || Rajadamnern Stadium  ||  Bangkok, Thailand  || Decision|| 5 || 3:00

|-  style="background:#cfc;"
| 1992-12-07 || Win ||align=left| Mathee Jadeepitak || Lumpinee Stadium || Bangkok, Thailand || Decision || 5 || 3:00

|- style="background:#cfc;"
| 1992-10-24 || Win||align=left| Rainbow Sor.Prantalay || Lumpinee Stadium ||  Bangkok, Thailand  || Decision || 5|| 3:00
|- style="background:#fbb;"
| 1992-08-07 || Loss ||align=left| Jaroensap Kiatbanchong || Lumpinee Stadium ||  Bangkok, Thailand  || KO (Punches)|| 2 || 
|-
! style=background:white colspan=9 |
|-  style="background:#cfc;"
| 1992-07-07 ||Win||align=left| Lamnamoon Sor.Sumalee || Lumpinee Stadium || Bangkok, Thailand || Decision || 5 || 3:00
|-
! style=background:white colspan=9 |
|-  style="background:#fbb;"
| 1992-06-09 ||Loss||align=left| Lamnamoon Sor.Sumalee || Lumpinee Stadium || Bangkok, Thailand || Decision || 5 || 3:00
|-  style="background:#cfc;"
| 1992-05-05 ||Win||align=left| Michael Sor Sukontip || Lumpinee Stadium || Bangkok, Thailand || Decision || 5 || 3:00
|-  style="background:#cfc;"
| 1992-04-07 ||Win||align=left| Chainoi Muangsurin || Lumpinee Stadium || Bangkok, Thailand || KO (Knee to the body)|| 3 ||
|-  style="background:#cfc;"
| 1992-03-06 ||Win||align=left| Samson Isaan || Lumpinee Stadium || Bangkok, Thailand || Decision || 5 || 3:00
|-  style="background:#cfc;"
| 1992-01-31 ||Win||align=left| Pomphet Naratreekul || Lumpinee Stadium || Bangkok, Thailand || Decision || 5 || 3:00
|- style="background:#cfc;"
| 1991-12-27 || Win||align=left| Pompetch Naratreekul || Lumpinee Stadium ||  Bangkok, Thailand  || Decision || 5 || 3:00
|- style="background:#cfc;"
| 1991-11-26 || Win||align=left| Karuhat Sor.Supawan|| Lumpinee Stadium ||  Bangkok, Thailand  || Decision || 5 || 3:00
|- style="background:#fbb;"
| 1991-11-05 || Loss||align=left| Duangsompong Por.Pongsawang || Lumpinee Stadium ||  Bangkok, Thailand  || Decision || 5 || 3:00
|- style="background:#cfc;"
| 1991-10-15 || Win||align=left| Duangsompong Por.Pongsawang || Lumpinee Stadium ||  Bangkok, Thailand  || Decision || 5 || 3:00
|- style="background:#fbb;"
| 1991-09-17 || Loss ||align=left| Nungubon Sitlerchai || Lumpinee Stadium ||  Bangkok, Thailand  || KO || ||
|- style="background:#fbb;"
| 1991-08-06 || Loss ||align=left| Nungubon Sitlerchai || Lumpinee Stadium ||  Bangkok, Thailand  || KO || || 
|-
! style=background:white colspan=9 |
|- style="background:#cfc;"
| 1991-07-02 || Win||align=left| Pongsiri Por Ruamrudee || Lumpinee Stadium  ||  Bangkok, Thailand  || KO (Knees)|| 4 ||
|- style="background:#cfc;"
| 1991-05-31 || Win ||align=left| Jaroensap Kiatbanchong || Lumpinee Stadium ||  Bangkok, Thailand  || Decision || 5 || 3:00
|-
! style=background:white colspan=9 |
|- style="background:#cfc;"
| 1991-04-30 || Win ||align=left| Jaroensap Kiatbanchong || Lumpinee Stadium ||  Bangkok, Thailand  || Decision || 5 || 3:00
|-  style="background:#fbb;"
| 1991-04-05|| Loss ||align=left| Oley Kiatoneway || OneSongchai, Lumpinee Stadium || Bangkok, Thailand || Decision || 5 || 3:00
|- style="background:#cfc;"
| 1991-03-05 || Win ||align=left| Dokmaipa Por Pongsawang || Lumpinee Stadium ||  Bangkok, Thailand  || Decision || 5 || 3:00
|- style="background:#cfc;"
| 1991-02-12 || Win ||align=left| Karuhat Sor.Supawan || Lumpinee Stadium ||  Bangkok, Thailand  || Decision || 5 || 3:00

|- style="background:#cfc;"
| 1991-01-26 || Win ||align=left| Tuktathong Por.Pongsawang || Lumpinee Stadium ||  Bangkok, Thailand  || Decision || 5 || 3:00

|-  style="background:#cfc;"
| 1990-12-07 || Win ||align=left| Mathee Jadeepitak || Lumpinee Stadium || Bangkok, Thailand || Decision || 5 ||3:00
|-  style="background:#fbb;"
| 1990-11-20 || Loss ||align=left| Jaroensap Kiatbanchong || Lumpinee Stadium || Bangkok, Thailand || Decision || 5 ||3:00
|-  style="background:#cfc;"
| 1990-10-12 || Win ||align=left| Orono Por Muang Ubon || Lumpinee Stadium || Bangkok, Thailand || Decision || 5 ||3:00
|-  style="background:#fbb;"
| 1990-08-31|| Loss||align=left| Samranthong Choochokchai || OneSongchai, Lumpinee Stadium || Bangkok, Thailand || TKO (Ref.Stop/Punches) || 4 ||
|-  style="background:#fbb;"
| 1990-06-26 || Loss ||align=left| Taweesaklek Ploysakda || Lumpinee Stadium || Bangkok, Thailand || Decision || 5 ||3:00
|-  style="background:#fbb;"
| 1990-05-15 || Loss ||align=left| Wangchannoi Sor Palangchai || Lumpinee Stadium || Bangkok, Thailand || Decision || 5 ||3:00
|- style="background:#cfc;"
| 1990-04-10 || Win||align=left| Pongsiri Por Ruamrudee || Lumpinee Stadium  ||  Bangkok, Thailand  || Decision || 5 || 3:00
|-  style="background:#fbb;"
| 1990-03-06|| Loss||align=left| Oley Kiatoneway || OneSongchai, Lumpinee Stadium || Bangkok, Thailand || Decision || 5 || 3:00
|- style="background:#cfc;"
| 1990-01-28 || Win||align=left| Michael Lieuwfat || Lumpinee Stadium  ||  London, England  || Decision || 5 || 3:00
|-  style="background:#fbb;"
| 1990-01-19|| Loss ||align=left| Boonlai Sor.Thanikul || Lumpinee Stadium || Bangkok, Thailand || Decision || 5 || 3:00
|-
! style=background:white colspan=9 |
|-  style="background:#cfc;"
| 1989-12-29 || Win ||align=left| Peemai Or Yuttanakorn || Lumpinee Stadium  || Bangkok, Thailand || Decision || 5 || 3:00
|-  style="background:#fbb;"
| 1989-11-27 || Loss||align=left| Rajasak Sor.Vorapin || Rajadamnern Stadium || Bangkok, Thailand || Decision || 5 || 3:00
|-
! style=background:white colspan=9 |
|-  style="background:#cfc;"
| 1989-11-02 || Win ||align=left| Rajasak Sor.Vorapin || Rajadamnern Stadium Raja champion vs Lumpinee champion || Bangkok, Thailand || Decision || 5 || 3:00
|- style="background:#fbb;"
| 1989-09-26 || Loss ||align=left| Kaensak Sor.Ploenjit || Lumpinee Stadium ||  Bangkok, Thailand  || Decision || 5 || 3:00
|- style="background:#c5d2ea"
| 1989-09-05 || Draw||align=left| Kaensak Sor.Ploenjit || Lumpinee Stadium ||  Bangkok, Thailand || Decision || 5 || 3:00
|-
! style=background:white colspan=9 |
|-  style="background:#cfc;"
| 1989-08-08 || Win ||align=left| Detduang Por Pongsawang || Lumpinee Stadium || Bangkok, Thailand || Decision || 5 || 3:00
|-  style="background:#cfc;"
| 1989-06-09 || Win ||align=left| Audnoi Lukprabat || 1st IMF World Championships || Anaheim, California, United States || Decision || 5 || 3:00
|-
! style=background:white colspan=9 |
|-  style="background:#cfc;"
| 1989-05-02 || Win ||align=left| Dokmaipa Por Pongsawang|| Lumpinee Stadium || Bangkok, Thailand || Decision || 5 || 3:00
|-
! style=background:white colspan=9 |
|- style="background:#cfc;"
| 1989-03-28 || Win ||align=left| Karuhat Sor.Supawan ||Lumpinee Stadium  ||  Bangkok, Thailand  || Decision || 5 || 3:00
|-  style="background:#cfc;"
| 1989-02-21 || Win ||align=left| Paruhatlek Sitchunthong || Lumpinee Stadium || Bangkok, Thailand || Decision || 5 || 3:00
|- style="background:#fbb;"
| 1989-01-27 || Loss ||align=left| Noppadet Sor.Rewadee || Lumpinee Stadium ||  Bangkok, Thailand  || Decision || 5 || 3:00
|- style="background:#c5d2ea;"
| 1989-01-06 || Draw||align=left| Karuhat Sor.Supawan ||Lumpinee Stadium  ||  Bangkok, Thailand  || Decision || 5 || 3:00
|- style="background:#cfc;"
| 1988-12-02 || Win||align=left| Pongsiri Por Ruamrudee || Lumpinee Stadium  ||  Bangkok, Thailand  || Decision || 5 || 3:00
|- style="background:#cfc;"
| 1988-10-13 || Win||align=left| Veeraphol Sahaprom || Rajadamnern Stadium  ||  Bangkok, Thailand  || Decision || 5 || 3:00
|-  style="background:#fbb;"
| 1988-09-09 || Loss ||align=left| Wangchannoi Sor Palangchai || Lumpinee Stadium || Bangkok, Thailand || KO || 2 ||
|-  style="background:#cfc;"
| 1988-07-26 || Win ||align=left| Dokmaipa Por Pongsawang || Lumpinee Stadium || Bangkok, Thailand || Decision || 5 || 3:00
|-  style="background:#fbb;"
| 1988-06-10 || Loss ||align=left| Jaroenthong Kiatbanchong || Lumpinee Stadium || Bangkok, Thailand || Decision || 5 || 3:00
|-  style="background:#fbb;"
| 1988-05-03|| Loss ||align=left| Chamuekpet Hapalang || Lumpinee Stadium || Bangkok, Thailand || Decision || 5 || 3:00
|-  style="background:#c5d2ea;"
| 1988-03-04|| NC ||align=left| Chamuekpet Hapalang || Lumpinee Stadium || Bangkok, Thailand || No Contest (gunshots in the arena) || 4 || 3:00
|-  style="background:#cfc;"
| 1988-01-22 || Win ||align=left| Yodphet Sor.Jitpattana || Lumpinee Stadium || Bangkok, Thailand || Decision || 5 || 3:00
|-  style="background:#cfc;"
| 1987-12-08|| Win ||align=left| Baeber Narupai || Lumpinee Stadium || Bangkok, Thailand || Decision || 5 || 3:00
|-  style="background:#cfc;"
| 1987-10-27 || Win ||align=left| Wangchannoi Sor Palangchai || Lumpinee Stadium || Bangkok, Thailand || Decision || 5 || 3:00
|-
! style=background:white colspan=9 |
|-  style="background:#cfc;"
| 1987-09-22 || Win ||align=left| Dokmaipa Por Pongsawang || Lumpinee Stadium || Bangkok, Thailand || Decision || 5 || 3:00
|-  style="background:#cfc;"
| 1987-08-28 || Win ||align=left| Paruhatlek Sitchunthong || Lumpinee Stadium || Bangkok, Thailand || Decision || 5 || 3:00

|-  style="background:#cfc;"
| 1987-07-31 || Win ||align=left| Hippy Singmanee || Lumpinee Stadium || Bangkok, Thailand || KO (Knees)|| 3 ||
|-  style="background:#fbb;"
| 1987-06-16 || Loss ||align=left| Paruhatlek Sitchunthong || Lumpinee Stadium || Bangkok, Thailand || Decision || 5 || 3:00
|-  style="background:#cfc;"
| 1987-05-19 || Win ||align=left| Dennuah Denmolee || Lumpinee Stadium || Bangkok, Thailand || Decision || 5 || 3:00
|-
! style=background:white colspan=9 |

|-  style="background:#cfc;"
| 1987-03-24 || Win ||align=left| Sangwannoi Sor.Rungroj || Lumpinee Stadium || Bangkok, Thailand || Decision || 5 || 3:00
|-  style="background:#cfc;"
| 1987-02-10 || Win ||align=left| Morakot Choiyim|| Lumpinee Stadium || Bangkok, Thailand || KO || 3 ||
|-  style="background:#cfc;"
| 1987-01-06 || Win ||align=left| Boonkerd Fairtex || Lumpinee Stadium || Bangkok, Thailand || Decision || 5 || 3:00
|-  style="background:#cfc;"
| 1986-12-10 || Win ||align=left| Yodmanut Sityodtong  || || Thailand || Decision || 5 || 3:00
|-  style="background:#cfc;"
| 1986-11-13 || Win ||align=left| Yodmanut Sityodtong  || Rajadamnern Stadium || Bangkok, Thailand || Decision || 5 || 3:00
|-  style="background:#cfc;"
| 1986-10-10 || Win ||align=left| Rongsak Fairtex  || Lumpinee Stadium || Bangkok, Thailand || Decision || 5 || 3:00
|-  style="background:#cfc;"
| 1986-09-18 || Win ||align=left| Tanoy Sit Daorong || Lumpinee Stadium || Bangkok, Thailand || Decision || 5 || 3:00
|-  style="background:#cfc;"
| 1986-08-29 || Win ||align=left| Thammawit Sakdisamut || Lumpinee Stadium || Bangkok, Thailand || Decision || 5 || 3:00
|-  style="background:#fbb;"
| 1986-07-06 || Loss ||align=left| Wanpichit Kaennorasing || Rajadamnern Stadium || Bangkok, Thailand || Decision || 5 || 3:00
|-  style="background:#cfc;"
| 1986-06-06 || Win ||align=left| Rongsak Fairtex  || Lumpinee Stadium || Bangkok, Thailand || Decision || 5 || 3:00
|-  style="background:#cfc;"
| 1986-05-13 || Win ||align=left| Rongsak Fairtex  || Lumpinee Stadium || Bangkok, Thailand || Decision || 5 || 3:00
|-  style="background:#cfc;"
| 1986-04-11 || Win ||align=left| Phetchan Saksitwichit|| Lumpinee Stadium || Bangkok, Thailand || Decision || 5 || 3:00
|-  style="background:#fbb;"
| 1986-02-04 || Loss ||align=left| Rattana Sitrungsak || Lumpinee Stadium || Bangkok, Thailand || Decision || 5 || 3:00
|-  style="background:#fbb;"
| 1985-12-31 || Loss ||align=left| Namphon Nongkee Pahuyuth|| Lumpinee Stadium || Bangkok, Thailand || Decision || 5 || 3:00
|-  style="background:#cfc;"
| 1985-11-05 || Win ||align=left| Sitthichai || Lumpinee Stadium || Bangkok, Thailand || Decision || 5 || 3:00
|-  style="background:#cfc;"
| 1985-10-11 || Win ||align=left| Khununlek Hapalang || Lumpinee Stadium || Bangkok, Thailand || KO || 2 ||
|-  style="background:#fbb;"
| 1985-08-23 || Loss ||align=left| Sitthichai ||Lumpinee Stadium || Bangkok, Thailand || Decision || 5 || 3:00
|-  style="background:#fbb;"
| 1985-07-12 || Loss ||align=left| Rattana Sor.Boonyaporn || Lumpinee Stadium || Bangkok, Thailand || Decision || 5 || 3:00
|-  style="background:#cfc;"
| 1985-06-08 || Win ||align=left| Sitthichai || Lumpinee Stadium || Bangkok, Thailand || KO || 3 ||
|-  style="background:#fbb;"
| 1985-05-10 || Loss ||align=left| Wangchannoi Sor Palangchai|| Lumpinee Stadium || Bangkok, Thailand || Decision || 5 || 3:00
|-  style="background:#cfc;"
| 1985-03-29 || Win ||align=left| || Lumpinee Stadium || Bangkok, Thailand || Decision || 5 || 3:00
|-  style="background:#cfc;"
| 1985-02-26 || Win ||align=left| Maewpa Suanmisakawan|| Lumpinee Stadium || Bangkok, Thailand || Decision || 5 || 3:00
|-  style="background:#cfc;"
| 1985-01-26 || Win ||align=left| Kechsak Phayakomsakda|| Lumpinee Stadium || Bangkok, Thailand || Decision || 5 || 3:00

|-  style="background:#cfc;"
| 1984- || Win ||align=left| Dejritnoi Sitchaichimplee|| || Thailand || Decision || 5 || 3:00

|-  style="background:#fbb;"
| 1984- || Loss ||align=left| Dujdao Phittaklongoen||  || Chiang Mai, Thailand || Decision || 5||3:00

|-  style="background:#cfc;"
| 1984- || Win ||align=left| Hokhak Hongpapmitsilp|| || Lamphun, Thailand || Decision || 5 || 3:00

|-  style="background:#cfc;"
| 1984- || Win ||align=left| Suelek Kiatmuangtai|| || Hat Yai, Thailand || Decision || 5 || 3:00

|-  style="background:#cfc;"
| 1984- || Win ||align=left| Sinchainoi Chokpreecha || || Rayong, Thailand || Decision || 5 || 3:00

|-  style="background:#cfc;"
| 1984- || Win ||align=left| Pungluang Kiatanan || ||  Thailand || Decision || 5 || 3:00

|-  style="background:#cfc;"
| 1984- || Win ||align=left| Thaninoi Sor.Samakkhi|| ||  Thailand || Decision || 5 || 3:00

|-  style="background:#cfc;"
| 1984- || Win ||align=left| Fahsathan Mantaylor|| || Chonburi, Thailand || Decision || 5 || 3:00

|-  style="background:#fbb;"
| 1984- || Loss ||align=left| Aitoi Singatthaphon|| Channel 7 Stadium || Bangkok, Thailand || KO || 2 ||

|-  style="background:#cfc;"
| 1984- || Win ||align=left| Aitoi Singatthaphon|| Channel 7 Stadium || Bangkok, Thailand || Decision || 5 || 3:00

|-  style="background:#fbb;"
| 1984- || Loss ||align=left| Wiratnoi Kiatrattaphol|| || Hat Yai, Thailand || Decision || 5 || 3:00

|-  style="background:#cfc;"
| 1983- || Win ||align=left| Maenoi Kiatnara|| || Chiang Mai, Thailand || Decision || 5 || 3:00

|-  style="background:#cfc;"
| 1983- || Win ||align=left| Panleknoi Sitpuchong|| || Phayao province, Thailand || KO || 3||

|-  style="background:#cfc;"
| 1983- || Win ||align=left| M.6 Mor.Lukphithak|| || Phrae province, Thailand || Decision || 5 || 3:00

|-  style="background:#cfc;"
| 1983- || Win ||align=left| Suelek Kiatmuangtai|| || Thailand || Decision || 5 || 3:00

|-  style="background:#cfc;"
| 1983- || Win ||align=left| Danchai Sitphophrommet|| || Thailand || Decision || 5 || 3:00

|-  style="background:#cfc;"
| 1983- || Win ||align=left| Surachai Lukyomarat|| || Thailand || Decision || 5 || 3:00

|-  style="background:#cfc;"
| 1983- || Win ||align=left| Nuaphiphob Singkhiri|| || Thailand || Decision || 5 || 3:00

|-  style="background:#fbb;"
| 1983- || Loss||align=left| Daoprakai Singthanasak|| || Bangkok, Thailand || Decision || 5 || 3:00

|-  style="background:#cfc;"
| 1983- || Win ||align=left| Mongleynoi Teknik|| || Bangkok, Thailand || Decision || 5 || 3:00

|-  style="background:#cfc;"
| 1983- || Win ||align=left| Phayanoi Saksarawut || || Bangkok, Thailand || Decision || 5 || 3:00

|-  style="background:#cfc;"
| 1983- || Win ||align=left| Namjai Premchai || || Bangkok, Thailand || Decision || 5 || 3:00

|-  style="background:#cfc;"
| 1983-01- || Win ||align=left| Witsanu Petdecha || || Thailand || Decision || 5 || 3:00
|-
| colspan=9 | Legend:

References

1967 births
Living people
Langsuan Panyuthaphum
Muay Thai trainers
Langsuan Panyuthaphum